Michaël Eytzinger (Freiherr Michael von Aitzing, Aitzinger, Eyzinger, or Eitzing) (born ca. 1530 in Obereitzing - died 1598 in Bonn), was an Austrian nobleman, diplomat, historian, and publicist, who wrote and published several works, including a renowned volume that states the principles of a genealogical numbering system, called an Ahnentafel, that is still in use today. 

Eytzinger first published the Ahnentafel in 1590 in his Thesaurus principum hac aetate in Europa viventium (Cologne), in which he described and illustrated his new functional theory of numeration of ancestors by providing genealogies of thirty-four sovereign houses of Europe. 

Eytzinger’s method was used by Jerónimo de Sosa, in his work Noticia de la gran casa de los marqueses de Villafranca in 1676, and was popularized by Stephan Kekulé von Stradonitz in his Ahnentafel-atlas in 1898.

He also wrote and published several histories, including Novus de Leone Belgico in 1583 that included the first cartographic representation of the Low Countries as Leo Belgicus. The lion motif was inspired by the heraldic figures that appear in the coats of arms of several Dutch constituencies, as well as in the arms of William of Orange. The map was published during the period when the Netherlands was fighting the Eighty Years' War for independence from Spain.

Major works
Novus de Leone Belgico eiusque topographica atque historica descriptione liber., 1583
Relatio historica Köln, 1584
Rerum vaticiniis accommodata historia: das ist eine Hystorische Beschreibung..., Köln, 1584
Bipartita septem temporum historia: das ist historische Beschreybung sieben underscheidlicher Zeiten. Köln, 1586
Thesaurus principum hac aetate in Europa viventium: quo progenitores eorum..., Köln, 1590

See also
Leo Belgicus

References

External links

 The Sosa–Stradonitz System or Ahnentafel Numbering System
 Freiherr Michael von Aitzing 

1530s births
1598 deaths
Barons of Austria
16th-century Austrian historians
Genealogists